Ray Stewart may refer to:

Ray Stewart (sprinter) (born 1965), Jamaican athlete
Ray Stewart (Scottish footballer) (born 1959), Scottish international footballer
Ray Stewart (Australian footballer) (1892–1966), Australian rules footballer
Raymond Stewart (New Zealand cricketer) (born 1944), New Zealand cricketer
Raymond Stewart (Jamaican cricketer) (born 1976), Jamaican cricketer
Raymond Lee Stewart (1952–1996), American spree killer